Abdisalam Bashiir Abdisalam is a Somali Swedish politician. He is the incumbent Mayor of Bosaso, the commercial and cultural capital of the autonomous Puntland region in northeastern Somalia. On September 6, 2018 District local Council unanimously voted in the favour of Abdisalam to lead the city over five years ahead. He previously was Mayor of Waiye District Puntland. He hails the Dishiishe clan of Darod.

External links

https://en.halbeeg.com/2018/09/06/abdisalam-bashir-elected-as-bossaso-mayor/
https://www.radioshabelle.com/bosaso-city-council-elects-new-mayor/

References

Ethnic Somali people
Living people
Mayors of places in Somalia
1989 births